Dulangan, also rendered as Dolangan or Dulgan, may refer to:
 Dulangan-e Olya
 Dulangan-e Sofla